Securities industry in China is an article on the securities industry in mainland China.

History
1995, China's first joint venture investment bank – China International Capital Corp (CICC) was established, shareholders included Morgan Stanley International.
March 2002, Changjiang Securities and BNP Paribas signed the Sino-foreign joint venture securities companies’ framework agreement, establishing the first joint-venture securities company after China entered the WTO.
June 2002, China Securities Regulatory Commission issued the "Establishment of Securities Companies with Foreign Equity Participation Rules", setting the maximum stake at 33% for foreign joint venture partners. The measure was implemented on July 1, 2002.
2004, Goldman Sachs Group joined with Gao Hua Securities to establish a joint venture Goldman Sachs Gao Hua Securities in order to enter China market.
September 2005, UBS Restructuring of Beijing Securities Project, preparation of UBS Securities was approved by the State Council. This was the first time for mainland to allow foreign institutions to own the management rights of mainland securities companies. This was also the first case for foreign institute to own the mainland securities license.
September 2006, China Securities Regulatory Commission (CSRC) announced a suspension on approval of new securities companies (including foreign-invested securities companies) and commercial offices.
May 2007, in the Second Sino-US Strategic Economic Dialogue (SED), Chinese Government promised to resume approval of new securities companies and declare a gradual expansion in the business scope of joint venture securities companies before the Third SED.
December 2007, CSRC announced the resume of approval of Joint-venture securities companies and qualified securities companies can apply to set up.
July 2007, CSRC announced a new regulatory classification base on securities companies risk managing ability and classified them into A (AAA, AA, A), B (BBB, BB, B), C(CCC, CC, C), D and E 11 classes.
December 2007, SCRC started to launch business license management on securities companies which indicate that securities companies’ ability on risk management will directly affect their capability in business scope, especially in the innovation business license
2007, 17 brokerages received A-class rating, in which 2 of them are AA while 15 are A in rating.
July 2008, 31 brokerages received A-class rating, in which 10 of them are AA while 21 are A in rating.
May 26, 2009, CSRC announced a new securities regulatory classification in order to improve the existing classification criteria of securities companies. Under new regulation, 30 brokerages received A-class rating, 58 in B-class rating and 17 in C-class rating.
China's securities companies are facing more fierce competitors from outside investors. Goldman Sachs, UBS and many other international foreign institutions started to set up joint venture securities companies in China.

Regulation 
In mainland China, the China Securities Regulatory Commission is the primary regulator; however, it has delegated certain activities to a self-regulatory organization called the Securities Association of China (SAC).

Mainland China began an IPO sponsor system began in 2004, which is similar to a sponsor system in Hong Kong began in 1999. In order to be publicly listed in China, a prospective listing firm must be sponsored by a securities company (investment bank) and the sponsor must assign sponsor representatives to the listing firm.  This In 2012, the SAC took over registration of sponsor representatives. The exam to become a sponsor representative is extremely difficult, with a one percent passing rate, and sponsor representatives have been highly compensated, with $1 million annual salaries in 2010. Despite this, they are viewed as often ineffective.

Equity share types and foreign investment 

Mainland shares are known as A-shares and are not typically available for purchase by foreigners. B-shares are available to foreigners, but are reputed to be more risky as they are available for less desirable companies. H-shares are for mainland China companies which are traded on the Hong Kong Stock Exchange.

Institutional investors can apply to become Qualified Foreign Institutional Investors (a program which began in 2002) and then are allowed to buy A-shares; the minimum assets under management was reduced from $5 billion to $500 million in 2012.

On 10 November 2017, China allowed foreign participation up to 51% in securities ventures.

On March 13, 2020, the Securities Regulatory Commission announced that the restriction on foreign shareholding ratio of securities companies will be abolished from April 1, 2020, and qualified foreign investors may submit applications for the establishment of securities companies or change of the actual controller of the companies in accordance with the requirements of laws and regulations, relevant regulations of the SFC and relevant service guidelines in accordance with the law. In the presence of the huge Chinese market, foreign-owned brokerage firms are coming in droves.

Securities companies classification
The China Securities Regulatory Commission in 2021 has classified securities companies as the following:

AA 

 CICC
 China Galaxy Securities
 China Merchants Securities
 CITIC Securities
 CSC Financial
 Essence Securities
 Everbright Securities
 GF Securities
 Guosen Securities
 Guotai Junan
 Huatai Securities
 Industrial Securities
 Orient Securities
 Ping An Securities
 Shenwan Hongyuan

A 

 AVIC Securities
 BOC International
 Beijing Gaohua
 Caida Securities
 Caitong Securities
 Capital Securities
 CDB Securities
 Changjiang Securities
 Credit Suisse Founder
 Dongguan Securities
 Dongxing Securities
 Eastern Fortune
 Founder Securities
 Great Wall Securities
 Guoyuan Securities
 Huaan Securities
 Huachuang Securities
 Hualin Securities
 Huaxin Securities
 Minmetals Securities
 Nanjing Securities
 Open Source Securities
 Shanxi Securities
 Sinolink Securities
 Soochow Securities
 Southwest Securities
 Tianfeng Securities
 Tokai Securities
 UBS Securities, China Branch
 Warburg Securities
 West China Securities
 Western Securities
 Zheshang Securities
 Zhongtai Securities
 Zhongtian Guofu

BBB 

 Bohai Securities
 Caixin Securities
 Central China Securities
 Cinda Securities
 Fed Securities
 Gold Dollar Securities
 Goldman Sachs Gao Hua
 Great Wall Guorui
 Guohai Securities
 Haitong Securities
 HSBC Qianhai
 Huajin Securities
 Hualong Securities
 Huaxing Securities
 Morgan Stanley Huaxin
 Northeast Securities
 Shengang Securities
 Zhongtian Securities

BB 

 Century Securities
 Datong Securities
 East Asia Qianhai
 First Capital Securities
 Guolian Securities
 Guorong Securities
 Hongta Securities
 Huafu Securities
 Intime Securities
 Kyushu Securities
 Minsheng Securities
 Wanlian Securities
 Xiangcai Securities
 Yingda Securities
 Yongxing Securities
 Yuekai Securities

CCC 

 Aijian Securities
 Chase Securities
 China Post Securities
 Guosheng Securities
 Hengtai Securities
 Horizon Securities
 Huarong Securities
 Jianghai Securities
 New Era Securities
 Pacific Securities
 Zhongshan Securities

CC 

 Guodu Securities

C 

 Chuancai Securities

D 

 N-Securities

Rankings
Data as of March 31, 2017 

	 	
Source: S&P Global

References

External links
 Securities Industry in China: Finding the bull
Bloomberg.com
Sac.net
Sac.net.cn

Securities (finance)
Industry in China
Finance in China